Binnenalster or Inner Alster Lake is one of two artificial lakes within the city limits of Hamburg, Germany, which are formed by the river Alster (the other being the Außenalster). The main annual festival is the Alstervergnügen.

Overview

History 
The phrase "inner" refers to the old city walls of Hamburg. The Binnenalster was the part of the lake that was "inside" the city walls. The lake was originally created to serve as a reservoir for a mill. As of 2008 the old city walls do not exist, instead two car and train bridges, the Lombardsbrücke and the Kennedybrücke, span the river.

Location 
The Binnenalster is bordered by embankment streets on three sides, only the northern side is bordered by a park. Jungfernstieg – on the southern side, opposite this park is a busy boulevard and center of the Binnenalster. Left and right, Ballindamm and Neuer Jungfernstieg accommodate a number of corporate headquarters and first class hotels.

Public events

Alstervergnügen 
The Alstervergnügen is an annual street fair held around the lake. It always takes place throughout the first weekend of September, and offers a wide variety of food, drink, vending and games stands, as well as some rock bands.

See also 
 
 List of lakes in Schleswig-Holstein 
 List of lakes in Germany

Notes

References

External links

 Photos of Binnenalster on bilderbuch-hamburg.de 
 Photos of Binnenalster on bilder-hamburg.info 
 Alstervergnügen Hamburg

Lakes of Hamburg
Tourist attractions in Hamburg

de:Alster#Binnenalster